Nyamdashiin Batsüren (born 21 December 1945) is a Mongolian boxer. He competed in the men's flyweight event at the 1972 Summer Olympics.

References

1945 births
Living people
Mongolian male boxers
Olympic boxers of Mongolia
Boxers at the 1972 Summer Olympics
Place of birth missing (living people)
Boxers at the 1974 Asian Games
Asian Games competitors for Mongolia
Flyweight boxers
20th-century Mongolian people
21st-century Mongolian people